Katung Aduwak (born March 21, 1980) was the winner of the premier edition of the Big Brother Nigeria reality TV show aired between March 5 and June 4, 2006. He hails from Zonkwa, Kaduna State, Nigeria and is a scriptwriter, producer and director as well as a graduate of Political Science. He was once a media panelist at the Harvard Africa Business School Forum and served for many years as Senior Channel Manager at MTV Base, Senior Creative Director at VIACOM International and Executive Director at Chocolate City. He is currently the CEO of One O Eight Media and African Partner for Campfire Media.

Career

Big Brother Nigeria
The 26-year-old Aduwak was named the winner of the event hosted by Michelle Dede and Olisa Adibua, the very first season on June 4, 2006 with a take home prize of $100,000. 11 years later, he revealed that the key to succeeding in the show was to him, in being oneself and also being strategic.

After Big Brother Nigeria
After the reality TV show, Aduwak proceeded to New York to further his education at the Digital Film Academy, graduating with a directorial degree and went into filmmaking.

Filmmaking
What was to have been Aduwak's debut film was Heaven's Hell. The actual release date was slated for January 23, 2015. The movie was, however, not released until May 10, 2019. The movie clips were shot in 2012 by One O Eight Media, partnering with BGL and Hashtag Media House and starred Nollywood actors and actresses and Nigerian singer Waje.

In 2020, Aduwak directed a short film exposing the conflict between African Americans and the African diaspora, titled Not Supposed to be Here.

Personal life
Aduwak is married to Raven Taylor-Aduwak and has a son.

Filmography

Movies
 Unwanted Guest (2011)
 PUNEET!TV (2012)
 When Love Happens (2014)
 Heaven's Hell (2019)
 Not Supposed to Be Here (2020)

Music
 "Superstar" - by Ice Prince (2011)

References

Nigerian cinematographers
Nigerian film directors
Nigerian film producers
People from Kaduna State
Nigerian screenwriters
1980 births
Living people
Big Brother (franchise) contestants
Big Brother (franchise) winners
Nigerian media personalities
Nigerian chief executives